Frederick Eugene Crawford (July 27, 1910 – March 5, 1974) was an American football player.

Early years
Fred Crawford was born on July 27, 1910 in Waynesville, North Carolina, the son of congressman William T. Crawford. Fred attended both Waynesville (NC)  Township HS and The McCallie School.

Football

College
He played at tackle and end for Wallace Wade's Duke Blue Devils, selected All-Southern in 1932 and a consensus All-American in 1933. Crawford was the first football player to gain first-team All-America honors from the state of North Carolina. He was mainly responsible in 1933 for the defeat of the Tennessee Volunteers, that team's first loss in over two and a half seasons. It caused Tennessee coach Bob Neyland to remark: "He gave the finest exhibition of tackle play I have ever seen." Duke won the Southern Conference the same year, winning 9 straight until a loss at Georgia Tech knocked Duke out of contention for the Rose Bowl. 

Crawford was elected to the NC Sports Hall of Fame in 1964, the College Football Hall of Fame in 1973, and the Duke Sports Hall of Fame in 1976.

One description of Crawford's play said he was "a hell-for-leather, hard-hitting, hard-charging, fast-running juggernaut" who "covered punts like a run-away express'" and "charged through the line like a lion going in for the kill. Coach Wallace Wade called Crawford "the greatest lineman I ever saw."

NFL
After a brief motion picture career, Crawford played professionally for the Chicago Bears. He played just a year due to a lack of size for an interior line position and a broken leg. George Halas discovered Crawford could throw quite far indeed, and in a preseason game let him throw what was a completion to Ed Kawal that went 82 yards in the air.

World War II
He served in the United States Air Force during World War II.

Florida
After the war until the time of his death he was an official with the Florida State Motor Vehicle Department.

References

1910 births
1974 deaths
All-American college football players
American football tackles
Chicago Bears players
College Football Hall of Fame inductees
Duke Blue Devils football players
People from Waynesville, North Carolina
All-Southern college football players
Players of American football from North Carolina
American football ends
Military personnel from North Carolina
United States Army Air Forces personnel of World War II